Thomas Paul Hennessey (February 15, 1942 – July 22, 2012) was an American football defensive back in the American Football League. He played for the Boston Patriots. He played college football for the Holy Cross Crusaders.

See also 
 List of NCAA major college yearly punt and kickoff return leaders

References

1942 births
2012 deaths
American football defensive backs
Boston Patriots players
Holy Cross Crusaders football players
Players of American football from Boston